The 1964–65 La Liga was the 34th season since its establishment. The season started on September 13, 1964, and finished on April 18, 1965.

Stadia and locations

League table

Results

Relegation play-offs 

|}

Pichichi Trophy

External links 
  Official LFP Site

1964 1965
1964–65 in Spanish football leagues
Spain